Machimosaurus is an extinct genus of machimosaurid crocodyliform from the Late Jurassic (Kimmeridgian and Tithonian) and Early Cretaceous. The type species, Machimosaurus hugii, was found in Switzerland. Other fossils have been found in England, France, Germany, Portugal, Switzerland and Tunisia. Machimosaurus is the largest known crocodyliform of the Jurassic.

Discovery and species

Christian Erich Hermann von Meyer in 1837 named isolated conical, blunt teeth with numerous longitudinal lines from Switzerland, Madrimosaurus hugii. However, in 1838, realising he had misspelled the name, he emended Madrimosaurus to Machimosaurus, from the Greek machimoi, ancient Egyptian troops deployed during the Ptolemaic Dynasty plus the -saurus suffix, literally meaning "pugnacious lizard". The teeth of Machimosaurus, with their rounded, blunt apex and stout morphology make them characteristic and easily identifiable compared to other teleosaurid teeth.

The type species, M. hugii, is known from the Kimmeridgian of Portugal, Spain, Tunisia and Switzerland. Machimosaurus ferox and M. interruptus were previously considered junior synonyms of M. hugii, but have been recently considered possible synonyms of Machimosaurus mosae.

Krebs (1967), considered M. mosae (Lienard, 1876) to be a junior synonym of M. hugii, but is considered a second valid species of the genus based on a nearly complete skeleton found from the late Kimmeridgian of France.

Two species also placed within Machimosaurus are M. bathonicus and M. rigauxi, from the Bathonian of France. However, these are gracile species, lacking the characteristic blunted teeth of Machimosaurus, and are probably referable to Steneosaurus.
 
Mark Young and his colleagues  made a detailed revision of the genus and recognized four species: M. hugii, M. mosae, M. nowackianus from Harrar, Ethiopia, and a new species, Machimosaurus buffetauti. They hypothesized that Machimosaurus may have been analogous to the Pliocene–Holocene genus Crocodylus in having one large-bodied taxon suited to traversing marine barriers and additional, geographically limited taxa across its range.

The fossilized anterior portion of the lower jaw from the Late Jurassic (Oxfordian or Kimmeridgian) of Ethiopia referred to the pliosaur Simolestes nowackianus, is in fact a large species of Machimosaurus.

In 2016, a new species of Machimosaurus discovered in Tunisia was described in the journal Cretaceous Research. Named Machimosaurus rex, it was the largest teleosauroid known at the time, estimated to be  in length (skull length ) based on a partial skeleton. M. rex was also the youngest teleosauroid known at the time. The discovery of M. rex indicates that teleosauroid crocodylomorphs survived the extinction event at the end of the Late Jurassic, but did not retain the biodiversity seen in the Jurassic.

Palaeobiology

Niche partitioning 
From the Kimmeridgian-age, semi-aquatic deposits of Oker, Lower Saxony, Germany two genera of teleosaurids (Steneosaurus and Machimosaurus) are known, in addition to the neosuchian genera Goniopholis and Theriosuchus. Machimosaurus and Steneosaurus are also found together in the same Tithonian-age deposits of western France.

Diet
 
Bite marks on an early Kimmeridgian sauropod (Cetiosauriscus) femur from Switzerland match teeth known from Machimosaurus hugii, also found in the same deposits. This suggests either scavenging on the sauropod's corpse, or active predation from the waters edge, much like living crocodilians. Kimmeridgian-age fossil turtles from "Solothurn Turtle Limestone" of northern Switzerland have bite marks, and splintered Machimosaurus teeth imbedded, while fossil turtles from the Late Jurassic of Germany also possess bite marks that match teeth of Machimosaurus found in the same deposit.

Morphofunctional analysis on the skull of Machimosaurus strongly suggests they ate turtles (chelonophagy). Morphological comparison of their teeth also confirms that they are adapted to seizing and crushing hard prey.

Locomotion
Based on the vertebrae (zygapophysial) articulations, Machimosaurus is considered to have lived in open-seas, swimming by lateral undulations of the tail with the limbs used for steering and balancing. Head and neck depressing (downward moving) muscles would have been well-developed, as their attachment site on the skull (basioccipital tubera) were large. This would have greatly assisted Machimosaurus in diving.

See also

List of marine reptiles

References

External links
 Angellis Net pdf
 Images on French Paleopedia

Prehistoric pseudosuchian genera
Prehistoric marine crocodylomorphs
Early Cretaceous crocodylomorphs of Europe
Late Jurassic crocodylomorphs of Europe
Early Cretaceous crocodylomorphs of Africa
Late Jurassic genus first appearances
Early Cretaceous genus extinctions
Thalattosuchians